Andronovo is a rural locality (a selo) and the administrative center of Andronovsky Selsoviet, Tyumentsevsky District, Altai Krai, Russia. The population was 471 as of 2013. It was founded in 1726. There are 9 streets.

Geography 
Andronovo is located near the Kulunda River 22 km west of Tyumentsevo (the district's administrative centre) by road. Gryaznovo is the nearest rural locality.

References 

Rural localities in Tyumentsevsky District